Emmaboda Municipality (Emmaboda kommun) is a municipality in Kalmar County, in south-eastern Sweden. Its seat is located in the town Emmaboda.

The present municipality was formed in 1971, when the market town (köping) of Emmaboda (itself instituted in 1930) was amalgamated with three surrounding rural municipalities.

Geography
The municipality borders to the municipalities of Nybro, Kalmar and Torsås in Kalmar County; to Karlskrona and Ronneby in Blekinge County; and Tingsryd and Lessebo in Kronoberg County. The nearest cities in its vicinity are Kalmar (pop. 35,170), Karlskrona (pop. 32,606), Växjö (pop. 55,600), and Nybro (pop. 12,598).

It is part of Glasriket, The Realm of Glass, where people have been producing glass products at least since the 17th century, and transported them to the rest of Sweden. The glassworks in Emmaboda municipality are mainly Johansfors, Åfors and Boda, the latter being one part of the supplier for the glass sculptor Kosta Boda.

Those interested in nature activities will find many opportunities of fishing in the many lakes and streams stretching through the municipality.

Localities
There are 6 urban areas (also called a tätort or locality) in Emmaboda Municipality.

In the table the localities are listed according to the size of the population as of December 31, 2005. The municipal seat is in bold characters.

Culture
The Emigrants, the works about the Swedish emigration to North America, written by Vilhelm Moberg that have spread around the world have put a focus on many places in the municipality mentioned in the novels. Moberg himself was born on a farm just north-west of the town Emmaboda in 1898, where a monument stone now stands since 1970. Nearby is also a small museum about the author. Duvemåla, the village where Karl Oskar and Kristina, the fictional main characters of the novels live, is also located in the municipality.

Historically, the dense forests in this area were a centre for Nils Dacke's rebellion fights against King Gustav Vasa in the 16th century, causing the king great troubles for a while, until he sent down troops gathered from the other provinces of Sweden. Naturally, the area today contains several remains and folk museums in honour of this time.

Every year in August, Emmaboda hosts a music festival called Emmabodafestivalen. The festival bill consists of various indie acts, mostly Swedish. In 2006 acts like José González and Hello Saferide played. The Magic Numbers were scheduled to play, but were held up at an airport and could not make it.

Industry
The largest employer is ITT Water & Wastewater, with a world-wide reputation for their submersible pumps and mixers for waste water treatment and pumping (mining, construction, municipal and industrial markets), with some 1,400 employees in the municipality.

Sister cities
Emmaboda has seven sister cities; of these the municipality only has regular contact with the two listed at the bottom:

Jeppo, Finland
Kvam, Norway
Jyderup, Denmark
Lefkada, Greece
Pionersky, Kaliningrad, Russia
Bartoszyce, Poland
North Bay, Ontario, Canada

References
Statistics Sweden

External links

Emmaboda Municipality - Official site
Glasriket - Tourism page, in Swedish, English and German
Emmabodafestivalen
ITT Water & Wastewater 

Municipalities of Kalmar County